No One Killed Jessica is a 2011 Indian Hindi-language murder mystery film written and directed by Rajkumar Gupta. It stars Vidya Balan and Rani Mukerji. Based on the Jessica Lal murder case, the film revolves on a bartender who dies after being shot by a politician's son and her sister's struggle to find justice for her death.

The film received widespread critical acclaim towards its screenplay and cast performances and emerged as a sleeper hit, grossing  approximately in its theatrical run. It was nominated for Best Film, Best Director (Gupta) and Best Actress (Balan) at the 57th Filmfare Awards, where it won Best Supporting Actress (Mukerji).

Plot 
Jessica, a bartender at an elite event in New Delhi, refuses to serve three men (Manish, Vishal and Lucky) alcohol after the last call. Manish, who is the son of a politician, shoots her in the head in response. There are dozens of eyewitnesses, but as Jessica's sister, Sabrina, discovers, they are either conveniently forgetful or willing to sell their testimony to the highest bidder, leaving an open-and-shut case hostage to greed and political influence.

Manish is taken into custody by the police and investigations begin. Inspector N. K. informs Sabrina that one of the two bullets that were sent for verification has been replaced. Sabrina's repeated attempts into getting the witnesses and evidence in order to prove Jessica's crime fail one by one. The court case runs until 2006. Due to lack of evidence and witnesses, the court acquits the culprits. Sabrina's mother suffers a heart attack due to the trauma caused by the news and dies in the hospital.

Meanwhile, reporter Meera Gaity finds out about the acquittal through a newspaper. Having expected Jessica's case to be an open and shut case, Meera is shocked, takes the matter in her own hands, and plans to get justice for Jessica. With the approval of her editor, she performs various sting operations and exposes the failure of law and order in the country while raising questions about the police and the authorities. Inspector N. K. helps Meera by sending her the tape of Manish where he confesses his crime. Meera uses the clip to publicly exploit the cases and starts to build up pressure on the system and Manish's father's political party.

Soon, the public, having followed the case on television, decides to protest against the cover-up by the powerful and bring justice to Jessica. A number of phone calls, SMS, and voice messages are sent through the channel in support for Jessica. Meera uses this public support to reach out to the government and the President for their help. A candlelight vigil march is organized for Jessica by the people of Delhi to stand for her and demand justice. Meanwhile, Sabrina, affected by all the trauma while fighting for her sister in court, seems to have given up and moved on. Meera approaches Sabrina to stand up for her sister again and assures her that she would get justice this time as she has the support of the entire city.

Political pressure gets mounted on the family of Manish and his father resigns from his position. The High Court summons the police for the recklessness they showed in the case. The police appeal to the High Court to have the case re-opened and it gets accepted. The case is promoted to the Supreme Court, where Manish is found guilty and is sentenced to life imprisonment. His allies, Vishal and Lucky, get punished with four years in jail.

Cast 
The cast is listed below:

 Vidya Balan as Sabrina Lal
 Rani Mukerji as Meera Gaity
 Yogendra Tiku as Sanjit Lal
 Satyadeep Mishra as Meera's boss
 Bubbles Sabharwal as Mallika Sehgal
 Geeta Sudan as June Lall
 Samara Chopra as Naina Sehgal
 Shireesh Sharma as Pramod Bharadwaj
 Myra Karn as Jessica Lal
 Raj Kumar Gupta as Meera's colleague
 Mohammed Zeeshan Ayyub as Manish P. Bharadwaj
 Rajesh Sharma as Inspector N. K.
 Neil Bhoopalam as Vikram Jai Singh
 Avijit Dutt as B. M. Pandit

Production 

No One Killed Jessica was Raj Kumar Gupta's second directorial venture after Aamir (2008). Gupta was inspired to address the Jessica Lal murder case for the film after he saw a Times of India headline about the case, appearing shortly after the accused Manu Sharma released by the court in 2006. The next year, he met Jessica's sister, Sabrina, to ask some additional information about the case. Gupta said that he spent between seven and eight months to rewrite the film's story: "The material is very sensitive and I had to bring it in the realm of cinema. There was hesitation. Will I be able to do justice to the spirit of the story? I was not sure. Finally, I took it as a challenge. It's my interpretation of the events." The film was produced by Ronnie Screwvala under UTV Spotboy, a subsidiary of UTV Motion Pictures.

After Kareena Kapoor refused to play one of the lead role, in January 2010, Rani Mukerji and Vidya Balan were cast to replace her. Mukerji was cast as the stubborn reporter Meera Gaity. Her role was the only fictional aspect in the film, and according to her, Gupta asked her "to build the character on my own and not draw inspirations from anybody". Mukerji stated that Meera has "dynamic" and "modern" character, adding, "It wasn't something that I had ever done before. I actually had to play a man!" Meanwhile, Vidya played the role of Sabrina. She was required to wear men's clothing that was oversized and loose. She described Mukerji as her "favorite" co-star and spoke positively of her rapport with the actress. Myra Karn featured as Jessica in her film debut; she revealed that Gupta had been persuading her to play the part for one year before she accepted. Gautam Kishanchandani finished casting for the film in April 2010.

Sabyasachi Mukherjee and Bibi Zeeba Miraie were the costume designers, and Ashley Lobo handed the choreography. While Sukant Panigrahy was the production designer, Helen Jones was the art director. Shooting took place at Netaji Subhash Chandra Bose International Airport, Ballygunge, Park Circus and New Market; as the crowds were hard to control, Gupta used hidden cameras to shoot scenes in these places. The filming was finished around July 2010, and Aarti Bajaj then edited the film.

Soundtrack 

The soundtrack for No One Killed Jessica was composed by Amit Trivedi and the lyrics were written by Amitabh Bhattacharya. It contains a total of six songs, with vocals performed by Aditi Singh Sharma, Anushka Manchanda, Bhattacharya, Biswajit Chakraborty, Joi Barua, Mame Khan, Meenal Jain, Raja Hasan, Raman Mahadevan, Robert Bob Omulo, Shilpa Rao, Shriram Iyer, Sonika Sharma, Sonu Kakkar, Tochi Raina, and Vishal Dadlani. The album was launched in the reality show Bigg Boss 4 on 24 December 2010.

The soundtrack received mixed reviews from critics. Joginder Tuteja, writing for Bollywood Hungama, called it "good" and "above expectations", particularly praising the compositions of "Dilli" which she described "racy, ferocious, vociferous, energetic and relentless". Giving the album a rating of two-and-a-half stars, Nikhil Hemrajani of the Hindustan Times saying, "Overall, the soundtrack fails to contain a cohesive sound and is rather mediocre."

Release 

No One Killed Jessica was one of the most anticipated Indian films of 2011. The trailer, which was released on 18 November 2010, generated controversy as it featured Mukerji cursing, showing her middle finger and smoking. The Central Board of Film Certification (CBFC) and the Ministry of Health and Family Welfare then asked Gupta to censor all of the scenes. The film was later certified A (restricted to adults) on 23 December by the CBFC without any cuts being made. The film's commercial expectations were mixed. The trade analyst Komal Nahta predicted that the absence of a male lead would negatively impact its opening. Indo-Asian News Service, however, felt that the film has "chances ... [to] lure audiences as it is based on one of the most talked about murder cases in the country".

No One Killed Jessica was released on 7 January 2011 and emerged a commercial success and one of the highest-grossing Indian films of the year; the Indo-Asian News Service called it "the lucky mascot". It faced competition from Sachin P. Karande's thriller Vikalp, Gaurav Jain's animation film Ashoka: The Hero and Rahat Kazmi's romantic comedy Impatient Vivek. On its opening day, the film earned . Still, despite a strong opening, the film gradually lost public interest; after three days of running, its daily earnings decreased.

On 1 February 2011, No One Killed Jessica was released on DVD. On 20 March, the film and a retrospective of Vidya's films—including Lage Raho Munna Bhai (2006), Paa (2009) and Ishqiya (2010)—were screened at the Bollywood and Beyond festival in Australia. On 11 March 2017, it was available for streaming on Netflix and Amazon Prime Video.

Critical reception 
No One Killed Jessica received positive reviews from critics upon release, with praise directed towards its screenplay and Balan and Mukerji's performances. It received a rating of 80 percent on the review aggregator website Rotten Tomatoes based on ten reviews, with an average rating of 6.5 out of 10. Writing for the entertainment portal Bollywood Hungama, Taran Adarsh gave the film 4 stars out of 5. He wrote of Mukerji's performance, "In the role of a spirited and audacious journo, Mukerji, who smokes non-stop, flings swear words every now and then and who rebuffs being a voiceless spectator when the culprits go scot-free, is simply exceptional." The critic felt that Mukerji "sinks her teeth into the character, giving it the much required pragmatism that it necessitates". Nikhat Kazmi of The Times of India found Mukerji to be "impeccable" in the role, which Kazmi described as "the world-wise, hard-talking, foul-mouthed journalist", and Baradwaj Rangan appreciated her for playing against type. Komal Nahta opined, "Mukerji does a fine job, getting into the skin of the character of the feisty journalist who has no qualms about speaking her heart out and using swear words at the drop of a hat." Daily News and Analysis Aniruddha Guha declared Mukerji's performance as "one of her best performances till date".

Anupama Chopra gave No One Killed Jessica 3 out of 5 stars, claiming that the film was "several notches ahead of the tripe we've been subjected to in theatres lately". This time, Chopra was critical of Mukerji's performance, arguing that "the character is written superficially and Rani's portrayal of her is equally banal. It's all about externals. She argues a lot and proudly labels herself a bitch but her hair stays perfectly in place and in the end, she even gets to do a super-hero-like slow motion walk." Sanjukta Sharma of Mint shared similar thoughts; she was believed that Mukerji was "overloaded and overdetermined and she blusters through the role of the "bitch" who gets away with everything". Rajeev Masand calling the film a "full-on melodrama that doesn't always ring true". He compared it with Aamir, and found No One Killed Jessica to be "disappointing". However, Masand appreciated the leads' performances; Masand called Balan "plays her character one-note, and seems to forget to invest any personality into Sabrina", and similarly on Mukerji's performance, saying: "... [D]espite being saddled with a cliché of a character, is more cinematically engaging, and knows exactly how to command the screen with her presence."

Sudhish Kamath of The Hindu said, "No One Killed Jessica is a fine film undoubtedly, but does not quite match up to the potential it had after a gut-wrenching first half." A critic from The Indian Express complimented the film for its success "to sustain interest as it makes itself way towards the climactic moment when the culprit, despite the best efforts of his politician father and his fawning courtiers, is nabbed." Mayank Shekhar, in a three-out-of-five-star review published in the Hindustan Times, said that Vidya "stunningly natural". In a review for Rediff.com, Savera R. Someshwar singled out Vidya's "stand-out" performance, noting: "... [H]er hesitant body language, her faith, her helplessness, her rage, her sorrow and her gratitude all come across beautifully." Kaveree Bamzai of India Today added, "Balan is strong and steady, often startling with her quietude." However, Renuka Rao (also from Daily News and Analysis) was less impressed by the performance and considered her to be "insipid and somewhat forced".

Less positive views for No One Killed Jessica was given by overseas critics. Writing for The New York Times, Andy Webster found that Gupta "effectively recreate[d]" the Jessica Lal murder case "a milestone ... in the history of a new India". Zara Farooqui of the Newsline magazine gave a mixed review for the film; she called Mukerji's introduction "is way too long", while praising her "doe-eyed beauty". Lisa Tsering of The Hollywood Reporter believed that Mukerji's role is "the flashiest". While Gulf News referred to Vidya as "brilliance", Screen International found her performance to be overshadowed by Karn, who played a role the critic described as "bubbly, bold and somewhat uppity". Richard Kuipers of Variety took note of its production aspects; he wrote that Goswamy's "fluid [cinematography]" and Panigrahy's "richly textured decor, spanning high- and low-end life in New Delhi top an impressive tech package".

Accolades

Notes

References

External links 
 
 

2010s biographical films
2010s Hindi-language films
2011 crime thriller films
2011 films
Films about women in India
Films directed by Raj Kumar Gupta
Films scored by Amit Trivedi
Films set in Delhi
Fictional portrayals of the Delhi Police
Hindi-language thriller films
Indian biographical films
Indian crime thriller films
Indian films based on actual events
Thriller films based on actual events
UTV Motion Pictures films